Robeilys Mariley Peinado Méndez (born 26 November 1997) is a Venezuelan athlete whose specialty is pole vaulting. She won the bronze medal at the 2017 World Championships in London. In addition, she won multiple medals in several age categories.

Peinado started off as a gymnast but switched to pole vault aged 12 as she was getting too tall for the sport. Her personal best in the event is 4.70 metres set in Cochabamba in 2018. This is the current national record.

Competition record

References

External links
 

1997 births
Living people
Venezuelan female pole vaulters
World Athletics Championships athletes for Venezuela
Sportspeople from Caracas
Athletes (track and field) at the 2014 Summer Youth Olympics
Athletes (track and field) at the 2015 Pan American Games
Athletes (track and field) at the 2019 Pan American Games
Pan American Games competitors for Venezuela
World Athletics Championships medalists
South American Games gold medalists for Venezuela
South American Games silver medalists for Venezuela
South American Games medalists in athletics
Competitors at the 2014 South American Games
Athletes (track and field) at the 2018 South American Games
Central American and Caribbean Games silver medalists for Venezuela
Central American and Caribbean Games bronze medalists for Venezuela
Competitors at the 2014 Central American and Caribbean Games
Competitors at the 2018 Central American and Caribbean Games
South American Championships in Athletics winners
Central American and Caribbean Games medalists in athletics
South American Games gold medalists in athletics
Athletes (track and field) at the 2020 Summer Olympics
Olympic athletes of Venezuela
21st-century Venezuelan women